The 2012–13 Boston Celtics season was the 67th season of the franchise in the National Basketball Association (NBA). The Celtics finished the regular season with a 41–40 won-loss record, which was the 3rd best in the Atlantic division, bringing an end to the 5-year run as Atlantic Champs and 7th best in the East. Their longest winning and losing streaks were 7 and 6 games respectively. The leading scorer was Paul Pierce, averaging 18.6 PPG. The leading rebounder was Kevin Garnett (7.8 RPG). Rajon Rondo led the team and the league in assists per-game with 11.1 despite only playing 38 games due to ACL injury. The Celtics only played 81 games as their April 16 game against the Indiana Pacers was cancelled in the aftermath of the Boston Marathon bombing and was not rescheduled because it would not have changed any part of the final Eastern Conference standings anyway. The Celtics would go on to lose in the first round of the playoffs to the New York Knicks in six games, marking the first time the Celtics were eliminated in the First Round of the playoffs since the 2004–05 season.

For the first time since 2006–07, Ray Allen was not on the roster as he was traded to the Miami Heat where he won his second title. This season would mark the end of the Pierce and Garnett era in Boston as they, along with Jason Terry, were traded to the Brooklyn Nets during the 2013 off-season.

Key dates
 June 28: The 2012 NBA draft took place at Prudential Center in Newark, New Jersey.
 October 30: The regular season begins with a 120–107 loss to the Miami Heat in a rematch from the previous season's playoffs.
 January 25: Rajon Rondo suffered a partially torn ACL injury in his right knee after a loss to the Atlanta Hawks and will miss the remainder of the season but is expected to be back by training camp for the 2013/14 season.
 February 1: Jared Sullinger underwent lumbar disc surgery in his back and will also miss the remainder of the season.
 February 11: Leandro Barbosa suffered a torn ACL in his left knee, along with a sprained MCL. He will be out for the rest of the season.
 April 3: Clinched a Playoffs berth with a win over the Detroit Pistons.

Pre-season

Game log

|- style="background:#fcc;"
| 1
| October 5
| @ Fenerbahçe Ülker
| 
| Jeff Green, Jared Sullinger (16)
| Jared Sullinger (8)
| Rajon Rondo  (9)
| Ülker Sports Arena12,191
| 0–1
|- style="background:#bfb;"
| 2
| October 8
| @ EA7 Emporio Armani Milano
| 
| Jeff Green, Rajon Rondo (17)
| Darko Miličić (9)
| Rajon Rondo  (6)
| Mediolanum Forum
| 1–1
|- style="background:#fcc;"
| 3
| October 13
| New York Knicks
| 
| Jared Sullinger (14)
| Micah Downs, Rajon Rondo, Jared Sullinger (7)
| Rajon Rondo, Jason Terry (4)
| XL Center
| 1–2
|- style="background:#fcc;"
| 4
| October 15
| @ Philadelphia 76ers
| 
| Paul Pierce (16)
| Brandon Bass, Paul Pierce (6)
| Rajon Rondo (6)
| Wells Fargo Center
| 1–3
|- style="background:#fcc;"
| 5
| October 16
| Brooklyn Nets
| 
| Paul Pierce (29)
| Jared Sullinger (9)
| Rajon Rondo (11)
| TD Garden
| 1–4
|- style="background:#bfb;"
| 6
| October 18
| @ Brooklyn Nets
| 
| Courtney Lee, Paul Pierce (18)
| Jeff Green, Jared Sullinger (6)
| Rajon Rondo (9)
| Barclays Center
| 2–4
|- style="background:#bfb;"
| 7
| October 20
| New York Knicks
| 
| Jeff Green (25)
| Jared Sullinger (8)
| Rajon Rondo (11)
| Times Union Center
| 3–4
|- style="background:#fcc;"
| 8
| October 21
| Philadelphia 76ers
| 
| Jeff Green, Rajon Rondo (12)
| Jeff Green (10)
| Rajon Rondo (10)
| TD Garden
| 3–5

Draft picks

Future draft picks

Credits

2014 second round draft pick from Brooklyn

Brooklyn's own 2014 2nd round pick to Boston. [Boston – Brooklyn, 6/23/2011]

2015 second round draft pick from Sacramento

Sacramento's own 2015 2nd round pick to Boston (top 55 protected in the 2015 Draft). If Sacramento's own 2015 2nd round pick is in the top 55 picks, then Sacramento's obligations to Boston shall be extinguished. [Boston – Sacramento, 2/17/2009]

2017 second round draft pick from Sacramento

Sacramento's own 2017 2nd round pick to Boston (top 55 protected in the 2017 Draft). If Sacramento's own 2017 2nd round pick is in the top 55 picks, then Sacramento's obligations to Boston shall be extinguished. [Boston – Sacramento, 2/24/2011]

Debits

2013 second round draft pick to Portland

Boston's own 2013 2nd round pick to Portland. [Boston-Houston-Portland, 7/20/2012]

Roster

 
 

 

 

 | inj = yes}}

{{NBA roster footer
| head_coach =
Doc Rivers
| asst_coach =
Kevin Eastman
Armond Hill
Mike Longabardi
Tyronn Lue
Jamie Young
Jay Larranaga
| ath_train =
Ed Lacerte
| str_cond =
Bryan Doo
| otherlegend = (DL) On assignment to D-League affiliate
| roster = https://www.basketball-reference.com/teams/BOS/2013.html
}

Regular season

Game log
Note: the Boston Celtics only played 81 games instead of 82 due to the cancellation of the scheduled April 16, 2013 game vs The Indiana Pacers after the Boston Marathon bombing.

|- style="background:#fcc;"
| 1
| October 30
| @ Miami
| 
| Paul Pierce (23)
| Kevin Garnett (12)
| Rajon Rondo (13)
| American Airlines Arena20,296
| 0–1

|- style="background:#fcc;"
| 2
| November 2
| Milwaukee
| 
| Kevin Garnett (15)
| Jared Sullinger (7)
| Rajon Rondo (11)
| TD Garden18,624
| 0–2
|- style="background:#cfc;"
| 3
| November 3
| @ Washington
| 
| Paul Pierce (27)
| Garnett, Pierce& Sullinger (7)
| Rajon Rondo (12)
| Verizon Center20,308
| 1–2
|- style="background:#cfc;"
| 4
| November 7
| Washington
| 
| Kevin Garnett (20)
| Kevin Garnett (13)
| Rajon Rondo (14)
| TD Garden18,624
| 2–2
|- style="background:#fcc;"
| 5
| November 9
| Philadelphia
| 
| Paul Pierce (24)
| Kevin Garnett (10)
| Rajon Rondo (20)
| TD Garden18,624
| 2–3
|- style="background:#cfc;"
| 6
| November 10
| @ Milwaukee
| 
| Paul Pierce (25)
| Paul Pierce (9)
| Rajon Rondo (11)
| Bradley Center14,589
| 3–3
|- style="background:#cfc;" 
| 7
| November 12
| @ Chicago
| 
| Rajon Rondo (20)
| Rajon Rondo (9)
| Rajon Rondo (10)
| United Center21,712
| 4–3
|- style="background:#cfc;" 
| 8
| November 14
| Utah
| 
| Paul Pierce (23)
| Kevin Garnett (8)
| Rajon Rondo (10)
| TD Garden18,624
| 5–3
|- style="background:#fcc;"
| 9
| November 15
| @ Brooklyn
| 
| Paul Pierce (22)
| Courtney Lee (9)
| Jason Terry (6)
| Barclays Center17,732
| 5–4
|- style="background:#cfc;"
| 10
| November 17
| Toronto
| 
| Jason Terry (20)
| Jared Sullinger (11)
| Rajon Rondo (20)
| TD Garden18,624
| 6–4
|- style="background:#fcc;"
| 11
| November 18
| @ Detroit
| 
| Jared Sullinger (16)
| Sullinger & Wilcox (5) 
| Rajon Rondo (10)
| The Palace of Auburn Hills12,214
| 6–5
|- style="background:#fcc;"
| 12
| November 21
| San Antonio
| 
| Rajon Rondo (22)
| Jared Sullinger (7) 
| Rajon Rondo (15)
| TD Garden18,624
| 6–6
|- style="background:#cfc;"
| 13
| November 23
| Oklahoma City
| 
| Paul Pierce (27)
| Kevin Garnett (9) 
| Rajon Rondo (16)
| TD Garden18,624
| 7–6
|- style="background:#cfc;"
| 14
| November 25
| @ Orlando
| 
| Kevin Garnett (24)
| Brandon Bass (12)
| Rajon Rondo (16)
| Amway Center17,037
| 8–6
|- style="background:#fcc;"
| 15
| November 28
| Brooklyn
| 
| Bass & Garnett (16)
| Kevin Garnett (10)
| Paul Pierce (7)
| TD Garden18,624
| 8–7
|- style="background:#cfc;"
| 16
| November 30
| Portland
| 
| Jeff Green (19)
| Pierce & Sullinger (8)
| Lee & Pierce (7)
| TD Garden18,624
| 9–7

|- style="background:#fcc;"
| 17
| December 1
| @ Milwaukee
| 
| Paul Pierce (19)
| Brandon Bass (8)
| Jason Terry (11)
| Bradley Center16,581
| 9–8
|- style="background:#cfc;"
| 18
| December 5
| Minnesota
| 
| Garnett & Pierce (18)
| Kevin Garnett (10)
| Rajon Rondo (11)
| TD Garden18,624
| 10–8
|- style="background:#fcc;"
| 19
| December 7
| @ Philadelphia
| 
| Paul Pierce (27)
| Rajon Rondo (13)
| Rajon Rondo (14)
| Wells Fargo Center17,921
| 10–9
|- style="background:#cfc;"
| 20
| December 8
| Philadelphia	
| 
| Kevin Garnett (19)
| Rondo & Sullinger (9)
| Rajon Rondo (11)
| TD Garden18,624
| 11–9
|- style="background:#cfc;"
| 21
| December 12
| Dallas
| 
| Paul Pierce (34)
| Rajon Rondo (9)
| Rajon Rondo (15)
| TD Garden18,624
| 12–9
|- style="background:#fcc;"
| 22
| December 14
| @ Houston
| 
| Paul Pierce (18)
| Green & Pierce (7)
| Rajon Rondo (13)
| Toyota Center15,679
| 12–10
|- style="background:#fcc;"
| 23
| December 15
| @ San Antonio
| 
| Pierce & Terry (18)
| Jared Sullinger (7)
| Rajon Rondo (9)
| AT&T Center18,759
| 12–11
|- style="background:#fcc;"
| 24
| December 18
| @ Chicago
| 
| Rajon Rondo (26)
| Bass & Garnett (8)
| Rajon Rondo (8)
| United Center21,825
| 12–12
|- style="background:#cfc;"
| 25
| December 19
| Cleveland
| 
| Paul Pierce (40)
| Paul Pierce (8)
| Rajon Rondo (8)
| TD Garden18,624
| 13–12
|- style="background:#fcc;"
| 26
| December 21
| Milwaukee
| 
| Paul Pierce (35)
| Paul Pierce (12)
| Rajon Rondo (11)
| TD Garden18,624
| 13–13
|- style="background:#cfc;"
| 27
| December 25
| @ Brooklyn
| 
| Rajon Rondo (19)
| Kevin Garnett (10)
| Paul Pierce (10)
| Barclays Center17,732
| 14–13
|- style="background:#fcc;"
| 28
| December 27
| @ L. A. Clippers
| 
| Kevin Garnett (16)
| Brandon Bass (9)
| Rajon Rondo (6)
| Staples Center19,552
| 14–14
|- style="background:#fcc;"
| 29
| December 29
| @ Golden State
| 
| Courtney Lee (18)
| Jeff Green (9)
| Kevin Garnett (4)
| Oracle Arena19,596
| 14–15
|- style="background:#fcc;"
| 30
| December 30
| @ Sacramento
| 
| Pierce & Terry (20)
| Kevin Garnett (12)
| Rajon Rondo (10)
| Sleep Train Arena15,305
| 14–16

|- style="background:#fcc;"
| 31
| January 2
| Memphis
| 
| Paul Pierce (17)
| Garnett & Pierce (7)
| Rajon Rondo (10)
| TD Garden18,624
| 14–17
|- style="background:#cfc;"
| 32
| January 4 
| Indiana
| 
| Garnett & Rondo (18)
| Jared Sullinger (10)
| Rajon Rondo (7)
| TD Garden18,624
| 15–17
|- style="background:#cfc;"
| 33
| January 5
| @ Atlanta
| 
| Paul Pierce (26)
| Rajon Rondo (11)
| Rajon Rondo (10)
| Philips Arena19,159
| 16–17
|- style="background:#cfc;"
| 34
| January 7
| @ New York
| 
| Paul Pierce (23)
| Kevin Garnett (10)
| Paul Pierce (6)
| Madison Square Garden19,033
| 17–17
|- style="background:#cfc;"
| 35
| January 9 
| Phoenix
| 
| Jeff Green (14)
| Jared Sullinger (16)
| Rajon Rondo (8)
| TD Garden18,624
| 18–17
|- style="background:#cfc;"
| 36
| January 11
| Houston
| 
| Paul Pierce (23)
| Jared Sullinger (11)
| Rajon Rondo (8)
| TD Garden18,624
| 19–17
|- style="background:#cfc;"
| 37
| January 14
| Charlotte
| 
| Paul Pierce (19)
| Garnett & Rondo (10)
| Rajon Rondo (12)
| TD Garden18,624
| 20–17
|- style="background:#fcc;"
| 38
| January 16
| New Orleans
| 
| Kevin Garnett (15)
| Paul Pierce (10)
| Rajon Rondo (11)
| TD Garden18,624
| 20–18
|- style="background:#fcc;"
| 39
| January 18
| Chicago
| 
| Rajon Rondo (30)
| Jared Sullinger (15)
| Rajon Rondo (7)
| TD Garden18,624
| 20–19
|- style="background:#fcc;"
| 40
| January 20
| @ Detroit
| 
| Garnett & Lee (16)
| Rajon Rondo (9)
| Rajon Rondo (15)
| The Palace of Auburn Hills17,575
| 20–20
|- style="background:#fcc;"
| 41
| January 22
| @ Cleveland
| 
| Rajon Rondo (17)
| Rajon Rondo (13)
| Rajon Rondo (8)
| Quicken Loans Arena14,192
| 20–21
|- style="background:#fcc;"
| 42
| January 24
| New York
| 
| Rajon Rondo (23)
| Kevin Garnett (12)
| Rajon Rondo (11)
| TD Garden18,624
| 20–22
|- style="background:#fcc;"
| 43
| January 25
| @ Atlanta
| 
| Kevin Garnett (24)
| Garnett & Rondo (10)
| Rajon Rondo (11)
| Philips Arena15,595
| 20–23
|- style="background:#cfc;"
| 44
| January 27
| Miami
| 
| Kevin Garnett (24)
| Paul Pierce (13)
| Paul Pierce (10)
| TD Garden18,624
| 21–23
|- style="background:#cfc;"
| 45
| January 30
| Sacramento
| 
| Paul Pierce (16)
| Paul Pierce (10)
| Kevin Garnett (5)
| TD Garden18,624
| 22–23
					
|- style="background:#cfc;"
| 46
| February 1
| Orlando
| 
| Jeff Green (17)
| Paul Pierce (11)
| Paul Pierce (7)
| TD Garden 18,624
| 23–23
|- style="background:#cfc;"
| 47
| February 3
| L. A. Clippers
| 
| Paul Pierce (22)
| Brandon Bass (8)
| Jason Terry (6)
| TD Garden18,624
| 24–23
|- style="background:#cfc;"
| 48
| February 6
| @ Toronto
| 
| Kevin Garnett (27)
| Paul Pierce (11)
| Paul Pierce (6)
| Air Canada Centre17,163
| 25–23
|- style="background:#cfc;"
| 49
| February 7
| L. A. Lakers
| 
| Paul Pierce (24)
| Chris Wilcox (9)
| Paul Pierce (6)
| TD Garden18,624
| 26–23
|- style="background:#cfc;"
| 50
| February 10
| Denver
| 
| Paul Pierce (27)
| Kevin Garnett (18)
| Paul Pierce (14)
| TD Garden18,624
| 27–23
|- style="background:#fcc;"
| 51
| February 11
| @ Charlotte
| 
| Jeff Green (18)
| Kevin Garnett (13)
| Paul Pierce (8)
| Time Warner Cable Arena15,709
| 27–24
|- style="background:#cfc;"
| 52
| February 13
| Chicago
| 
| Brandon Bass (14)
| Kevin Garnett (11)
| Paul Pierce (6)
| TD Garden18,624
| 28–24
|- align="center"
|colspan="9" bgcolor="#bbcaff"|All-Star Break
|- style="background:#fcc;"
| 53
| February 19
| @ Denver
| 
| Jeff Green (20)
| Garnett & Bass (9)
| Paul Pierce (6)
| Pepsi Center19,155
| 28–25
|- style="background:#fcc;"
| 54
| February 20
| @ L. A. Lakers
| 
| Paul Pierce (26)
| Jeff Green (7)
| Paul Pierce (5)
| Staples Center 18,997
| 28–26
|- style="background:#cfc;"
| 55
| February 22
| @ Phoenix
| 
| Jeff Green (31)
| Chris Wilcox (8)
| Williams & Green (4) 
| US Airways Center18,422
| 29–26
|- style="background:#fcc;"
| 56
| February 24
| @ Portland
| 
| Paul Pierce (23)
| Kevin Garnett (9)
| Paul Pierce (8)
| Rose Garden20,484
| 29–27
|- style="background:#cfc;"
| 57
| February 25
| @ Utah
| 
| Paul Pierce (26)
| Kevin Garnett (8)
| Paul Pierce (8)
| EnergySolutions Arena19,911
| 30–27

|- style="background:#cfc;"
| 58
| March 1
| Golden State
| 
| Paul Pierce (26)
| Kevin Garnett (13)
| Pierce & Terry (4) 
| TD Garden18,624
| 31–27
|- style="background:#cfc;"
| 59
| March 5
| @ Philadelphia
| 
| Avery Bradley (22)
| Kevin Garnett (11)
| Paul Pierce (7)
| Wells Fargo Center16,189
| 32–27
|- style="background:#cfc;"
| 60
| March 6
| @ Indiana
| 
| Kevin Garnett (18)
| Kevin Garnett (10)
| Pierce, Terry, Green, & Bradley (4)
| Bankers Life Fieldhouse17,833
| 33–27
|- style="background:#cfc;"
| 61
| March 8
| Atlanta	
| 
| Paul Pierce (27)
| Kevin Garnett (8)
| Paul Pierce (7)
| TD Garden18,624
| 34–27
|- style="background:#fcc;"
| 62
| March 10
| @ Oklahoma City
| 
| Paul Pierce (20)
| Brandon Bass (13)
| Paul Pierce (6)
| Chesapeake Energy Arena18,203
| 34–28
|- style="background:#fcc;"
| 63
| March 12
| @ Charlotte
| 
| Jeff Green (14)
| Brandon Bass (7)
| Lee & Terry (4) 
| Time Warner Cable Arena15,006
| 34–29
|- style="background:#cfc;"
| 64
| March 13
| Toronto
| 
| Jeff Green (20)
| Kevin Garnett (7)
| Lee & Pierce (4)
| TD Garden18,624
| 35–29
|- style="background:#cfc;"
| 65
| March 16
| Charlotte
| 
| Jason Terry (15)
| Shavlik Randolph (8)
| Paul Pierce (8)
| TD Garden18,624
| 36–29
|- style="background:#fcc;"
| 66
| March 18
| Miami
| 
| Jeff Green (43)
| Paul Pierce (8)
| Paul Pierce (8)
| TD Garden18,624
| 36–30
|- style="background:#fcc;"
| 67
| March 20
| @ New Orleans
| 
| Paul Pierce (28)
| Bass & Garnett (6)
| Paul Pierce (5)
| New Orleans Arena 14,740
| 36–31			
|- style="background:#fcc;"
| 68
| March 22
| @ Dallas
| 
| Paul Pierce (16)
| Kevin Garnett (12)
| Kevin Garnett (5)
| American Airlines Center20,387 
| 36–32
|- style="background:#fcc;"
| 69
| March 23
| @ Memphis
| 
| Paul Pierce (26)
| Bass & Pierce (6)
| Green & Paul Pierce (4) 
| FedExForum 18,119
| 36–33
|- style="background:#fcc;"
| 70
| March 26
| New York
| 
| Jeff Green (19)
| Jeff Green (10)
| Crawford, Green, & Pierce (6)
| TD Garden18,624
| 36–34
|- style="background:#cfc;"
| 71
| March 27
| @ Cleveland
| 
| Brandon Bass (22)
| Paul Pierce (10)
| Paul Pierce (8)
| Quicken Loans Arena14,192
| 37–34
|- style="background:#cfc;"
| 72
| March 29
| Atlanta
| 
| Jeff Green (27)
| Shavlik Randolph (13)
| Paul Pierce (10)
| TD Garden18,624
| 38–34
|- style="background:#fcc;"
| 73
| March 31
| @ New York
|  
| Jeff Green (27)
| Paul Pierce (15)
| Paul Pierce (5)
| Madison Square Garden19,033 
| 38–35
					
|- style="background:#fcc;"
| 74
| April 1
| @ Minnesota
|  
| Avery Bradley (19)
| Jeff Green (7)
| Jeff Green (5)
| Target Center14,546 
| 38–36
|- style="background:#cfc;"
| 75
| April 3
| Detroit
| 
| Jeff Green (34)
| Brandon Bass (7)
| Paul Pierce (5)
| TD Garden18,624
| 39–36
|- style="background:#fcc;"
| 76
| April 5
| Cleveland
| 
| Jeff Green (23)
| Jeff Green (9)
| Jordan Crawford (5)
| TD Garden18,624
| 39–37
|- style="background:#cfc;"
| 77
| April 7
| Washington
| 
| Brandon Bass (20)
| Shavlik Randolph (7)
| Lee, Pierce, & Terry (5)
| TD Garden18,624
| 40–37
|- style="background:#fcc;"
| 78
| April 10
| Brooklyn
| 
| Paul Pierce (23)
| Shavlik Randolph (9)
| Crawford & Garnett (4)
| TD Garden18,624
| 40–38
|- style="background:#fcc;"
| 79
| April 12
| @ Miami
|  
| Jeff Green (25)
| Brandon Bass (9)
| Jason Terry (3)
| American Airlines Arena19,990 
| 40–39
|- style="background:#cfc;"
| 80
| April 13
| @ Orlando
| 
| Courtney Lee (20)
| Kevin Garnett (9)
| Paul Pierce (8)
| Amway Center 17,422
| 41–39
|- style="background:#ccc;"
| –
| April 16
| Indiana
| colspan="7" | Game canceled due to the Boston Marathon bombing.
|- style="background:#fcc;"
| 81
| April 17
| @ Toronto
| 
| Jordan Crawford (16)
| Crawford & Green (6)
| Crawford & Williams (5)
| Air Canada Centre 17,690
| 41–40

Standings

Playoffs

Game log

|- style="background:#fcc;"
| 1
| April 20
| @ New York
| 
| Jeff Green (26)
| Brandon Bass (10)
| Paul Pierce (7)
| Madison Square Garden19,033
| 0–1
|- style="background:#fcc;"
| 2
| April 23
| @ New York
| 
| Paul Pierce (18)
| Kevin Garnett (11)
| Paul Pierce (6)
| Madison Square Garden19,033
| 0–2
|- style="background:#fcc;"
| 3
| April 26
| New York
| 
| Jeff Green (21)
| Kevin Garnett (17)
| Paul Pierce (5)
| TD Garden18,624
| 0–3
|- style="background:#bfb;"
| 4
| April 28
| New York
| 
| Paul Pierce (29)
| Kevin Garnett (17)
| Garnett & Pierce (6) 
| TD Garden18,624
| 1–3
|- style="background:#bfb;"
| 5
| May 1
| @ New York
| 
| Jeff Green (18)
| Kevin Garnett (18)
| Kevin Garnett (5)
| Madison Square Garden19,033
| 2–3
|- style="background:#fcc;"
| 6
| May 3
| New York
| 
| Jeff Green (21)
| Kevin Garnett (10)
| Paul Pierce (5)
| TD Garden18,624
| 2–4

Transactions

Overview

Trades

Free agents

References

External links
2012–13 Boston Celtics season Official Site
2012–13 Boston Celtics season at ESPN

Boston Celtics seasons
Boston Celtics
Boston Celtics
Boston Celtics
Celtics
Celtics